The Philippine Alliance of Human Rights Advocates (PAHRA) is a non-profit, national human rights organization in the Philippines, Manila. PAHRA is an alliance of individuals, institutions and organizations committed to the promotion, protection and realization of human rights on the national and international level. The organization's task is to promote and defend human rights, prevent Human Rights violations and abuses by. Its main work is to build up a network on progressive human rights organization on national level as well as in the international level. The organization primarily campaigns for civil and political rights; economic, social and cultural rights; human rights defenders.

Historically it was founded in 1986 as a result of the President Ferdinand Marcos' administration under Martial law. TFDP and numerous other human rights organizations established PAHRA.

Membership
International Federation for Human Rights (FIDH)
Asian Forum for Human Rights and Development (FORUM-ASIA)
Asian Network for Free Elections (ANFREL)

References

External links
 Philippine Alliance of Human Rights Advocates (official website)

1986 establishments in the Philippines
Human rights organizations based in the Philippines